Pelican Blood is a 2019 German-Bulgarian drama horror film directed by Katrin Gebbe and starring Nina Hoss. The film was screened in the Horizons section at the 76th Venice International Film Festival.

It received the Méliès d'Or for Best European Fantastic Film.

Premise 
“A woman who trains police horses adopts her second child, a severely traumatised 5-year-old girl. When the girl shows violent and anti-social behaviour, her new mother becomes determined to help her.”

Cast
 Nina Hoss as Wiebke
 Katerina Lipovska as Raya
 Yana Marinova as Sigrid
 Murathan Muslu as Benedict
 Sophie Pfennigstorf as Alma
 Dimitar Banenkin as Hagen
 Daniela Holtz as Bibi

Critical reception

References

External links
 

2019 films
2019 drama films
German drama films
2010s German-language films
Bulgarian drama films
2010s German films